The 2019–20 WRU Championship was the eighth season of the WRU Championship, the second tier of club rugby in Wales run by the Welsh Rugby Union. The league expanded to 14 teams from 12 seasons for the previous three seasons.

The season was cancelled on 20 March 2020 due to the COVID-19 pandemic in the United Kingdom.

Structure 
Each team in the Championship will play each other twice on a home and away basis for a total of 26 matches played each. The team with the most points at the end of the season will be declared the winners. The winning club will be promoted to the 2020-21 WRU Premiership, provided they meet the "A" License criteria. At the end of the season, the bottom four clubs will be relegated.

Teams 
At the end of last season, Bedlinog, Newcastle Emlyn, Newbridge and Rhydyfelin were all relegated to Division 1 (specific league based on geographic location). The winners of each Division 1 entered into play-offs to decide the remaining two places. The winners of the two Eastern divisions faced each other as did the winners of the two Western divisions. The winners were East Central champions Glamorgan Wanderers and West Central champions Ystalyfera who beat Brecon and Felinfoel respectively. Joining these teams are the four clubs relegated from last season's Premiership. These clubs are Bedwas, Cross Keys, Bargoed and Neath.

Promotion play-offs 

Glamorgan Wanderers won 57–40 on aggregate.

Ystalyfera won 64–48 on aggregate.

Standings

References

External links 
 

Welsh Championship
WRU Championship
Wales
WRU Championship